Tabasco is a hamlet in Ulster County, New York, United States. It is located north of Kerhonkson, along Ulster County Road 3 (Samsonville-Kerhonkson Road).

References

Hamlets in New York (state)
Hamlets in Ulster County, New York